Criminal (French: Criminel) is a 1933 French drama film directed by Jack Forrester and starring Harry Baur, Pierre Alcover and Jean Servais. It is a remake of the 1931 America film The Criminal Code by Howard Hawks, itself based on a 1929 play of the same title by Martin Flavin.

Cast
 Harry Baur as Warden Brady
 Pierre Alcover as Le gardien chef
 Jean Servais as Bob Graham
 Hélène Perdrière as Mary Brody
 Daniel Mendaille as Galloway
 Pauline Carton	
 Alfred Argus		
 Léon Arvel	
 Armand Caratis	
 Alberte Gallé	
 Jean Gaubens	
 Monique Joyce		
 François Viguier

References

Bibliography 
 Goble, Alan. The Complete Index to Literary Sources in Film. Walter de Gruyter, 1999.

External links 
 

1933 films
1933 drama films
French drama films
1930s French-language films
Remakes of American films
1930s French films